The Dale Jr. Download is a free audio and video podcast hosted by American motorsports analyst and semi-retired stock car racing driver Dale Earnhardt Jr. It is co-hosted by Mike Davis, JR Motorsports' Director of Communications, who has been a business partner of Earnhardt's since 2003.

History 
The podcast was launched in 2013 when Earnhardt and his NASCAR Xfinity Series race team JR Motorsports started an online network called Dirty Mo Radio. The "Mo" is an homage to Earnhardt's hometown of Mooresville, North Carolina. Originally, the podcast was hosted by Davis and North Carolina radio personality Taylor Zarzour, with Earnhardt himself only occasionally making appearances on the show. 

Earnhardt's first appearance came on the show's 22nd episode, five months into the podcast's launch. A segment was added to the show in 2014 that played audio Earnhardt had pre-recorded remotely in the immediate hours after a race. His involvement increased once again in 2016 while he was recovering from concussion symptoms, appearing on the show regularly to give updates on his recovery. In 2017, Earnhardt took over as the show's regular host along with Tyler Overstreet. Overstreet served as Earnhardt's road manager until the end of the 2017 season when he moved to Joe Gibbs Racing. 

After Overstreet's departure from JR Motorsports, Davis returned to co-host the show and has been Earnhardt's regular co-host since 2018. In 2019, interviews with guests became a regular part of the podcast. Guests on Earnhardt's podcast have included Earnhardt's nephew and Xfinity Series driver Jeffrey Earnhardt, former NASCAR president and current NASCAR vice chairman Mike Helton, current NASCAR president Steve Phelps, Earnhardt's former car owner Rick Hendrick, NHRA champion John Force, 2019 Indianapolis 500 winner Simon Pagenaud, and WWE Hall of Famer Stone Cold Steve Austin.

Television show 
In late 2017, NASCAR on NBC announced plans to give Earnhardt his own television show as he joined the network's motorsports coverage. NBC chose to simulcast parts of Earnhardt's podcast, and The Dale Jr. Download debuted on NBCSN as a half-hour television show on June 21. The show expanded to one hour in 2019, formally called NASCAR America Presents The Dale Jr. Download. When NBCSN shut down, the show moved to NBC's Peacock streaming service in 2022.

References

External links 
 
 

Audio podcasts
Sports podcasts
Video podcasts
2013 podcast debuts
Interview podcasts
Dale Earnhardt Jr.
NASCAR mass media